Dorado is a southern constellation.

Dorado may also refer to:

Biology
 Coryphaena, a genus of oceanic fish also known as dolphinfishes
 Mahi-mahi
 Salminus, freshwater fish from South America
 Salminus brasiliensis, a popular sport fish

Computers
 Dorado Software, IT company specializing in the development of network management software
 Xerox Dorado, a CPU used as a developer machine at Xerox PARC and in the Xerox 1132 Lisp machine
 ClearPath Dorado computers, by Unisys

Other uses
 Dorado (album) by Son of the Velvet Rat, 2017
 Dorado (grape), another name for the Portuguese wine grape Loureira
 "Dorado" (song), a 2020 song by Mahmood, Sfera Ebbasta and Feid
 Dorado, Puerto Rico, a municipality in Puerto Rico
 Dorado Airport, an airport in Dorado, Puerto Rico
 Dorado Wings, a Puerto Rican airline that operated between 1964 and 1982
 Javier Dorado (born 1977), Spanish footballer
 Dorados de Sinaloa, a Mexican professional football club

See also 
El Dorado
USS Dorado
USCGC Dorado
Dourado (disambiguation)